Beaglehole or Beauglehole   is a Cornish surname. Notable people with this surname include the following:

 Alexander Clifford Beauglehole (1920–2002), Australian farmer, plant collector and naturalist
 Ann Beaglehole (born 1948), Hungarian-born New Zealand historian; former wife of David Beaglehole
 David Beaglehole (1938–2014), New Zealand physicist; former husband of Ann Beaglehole 
 Ernest Beaglehole (1906–1965), New Zealand academic, psychologist and ethnographer; brother of John Beaglehole 
 Helen Beaglehole (born 1946), New Zealand writer, editor and historian; wife of Tim Beaglehole
 John Beaglehole (1901–1971), New Zealand academic and historian; brother of Ernest Beaglehole 
 Steve Beaglehole, English football coach 
 Tim Beaglehole (1933–2015), New Zealand academic; son of John Beaglehole and husband of Helen Beaglehole

See also

 Beaglehole Glacier

Cornish-language surnames